Antonio Cánovas del Castillo y Vallejo, better known as Kaulak (22 December 1862, Madrid – 13 September 1933, Madrid) was a Spanish photographer, art critic, editor and amateur painter. His uncle was the assassinated Prime Minister, Antonio Cánovas del Castillo, hence his use of a pseudonym; the meaning of which is unexplained, although the word appears to be of Basque origin.

Biography 
He was originally a lawyer, and held several public offices before deciding to devote himself to photography. This included high positions in the ministries of Interior and Justice, as well as holding a seat in the Cortes (legislature), representing the constituency of Cieza, in the early 1890s.

As for his photographic activity, he opposed pictorialism, which was the prevalent approach at the time, in favor of professional portraits, rendered in a "purist" manner. He eventually came to be known as the "Spanish Nadar". His portraits encompassed a wide range of notables, including Prime Minister, Antonio Maura, writers such as José de Echegaray, his fellow photographer, and the torero, as well as members of the Royal Family.

They were later issued as postcards. He also created a series of postcards with the Swiss-born photographers, Adolfo Menet (1866–1927) and Oscar Hauser.

He opened the Kaulak Studios on the Calle de Alcalá in 1904, and immediately attracted an upper-class clientele. In 1912, he published a technical manual: La fotografía moderna. Manual compendiado de los conocimientos indispensables del fotógrafo, under his real name. 

He died in Madrid, aged seventy, and was interred at Saint Isidore Cemetery. His studio was operated by his family, except for a period during the Spanish Civil War, and remained in business until 1989.

Selected works

References

Further reading 
 José Altabella, Los grandes de la fotografía española: «Kaulak», ABC, 1975 (Online)
 Antonio Gómez Iruela, Las galerías fotográficas de Madrid en los inicios de la fotografía, (Online)
 Jorge Latorre Izquierdo, "Arte e identidades culturales: actas del XII Congreso Nacional del Comité Español de Historia del Arte", in: Fotografía del 98, University of Oviedo,  
 Marie-Loup Sougez, Historia de la Fotografía, Madrid, Cátedra, 2004. 
 Diccionario de fotógrafos españoles, various authors, Oliva Maria Rubio (Ed.), La Fábrica, 2014 (Online)

External links

  "Un excelente artista: ha muerto Kaulak", obituary from 

1862 births
1933 deaths
Spanish photographers
Members of the Cortes Generales
Spanish art critics
Spanish editors
People from Madrid